Maurice Tulloch (born March 1969) is a British/Canadian businessman, who was the chief executive officer (CEO) of Aviva from March 2019 to July 2020.

Early life
Tulloch was born in March 1969 in Falkirk, Scotland. He has dual British and Canadian nationality.

He earned a bachelor's degree in economics from the University of Waterloo in Canada and an MBA from Heriot-Watt University in Edinburgh. He is a Chartered Professional Accountant (CPA, CMA).

Career
Tulloch joined Aviva in 1992, rising to CEO, international insurance and chairman of global general insurance. Tulloch joined the board of directors in June 2017.

On 4 March 2019, Tulloch succeeded Mark Wilson, who was ousted as CEO of Aviva in October 2018. He stepped down from his position for 'family health reasons in July 2020, and was replaced by Amanda Blanc.

References

1969 births
Aviva people
Living people
University of Waterloo alumni
Alumni of Heriot-Watt University
British chief executives
Canadian chief executives
People from Falkirk
British accountants
Canadian accountants